The Art of Broken Glass is a five-track EP by rapper producer Mr. J. Medeiros. It was released in 2009.

Track listing
"Broken Windows"
"Love is All" (featuring Tara Ellis)
"The Measure" (featuring Jonathan Korsyzk)
"Tower of Cards"
"Broken Windows" (featuring D. J. Vajra)

References

2009 EPs
Mr. J. Medeiros albums